Masinga Constituency is an electoral constituency in Kenya. It is one of eight constituencies in Machakos County. The constituency has seven wards, all electing councillors for the Masaku county council. The constituency was established for the 1988 elections.

Members of Parliament

Locations and wards

External links 
Map of the constituency

Constituencies in Eastern Province (Kenya)
Constituencies in Machakos County
1988 establishments in Kenya
Constituencies established in 1988